Nipania is a village situated in south of Banmankhi, in the Purnia district of Bihar, India. It has a population of approximately 5,000.

It is well connected through road by Banmankhi and Dhamdaha subdivisions; Banmankhi Junction is the nearest railway station. It has a middle school and a Shrikrishna temple. Nearby villages include Magurjan, Aliganj, Gangaili, Maharajganj and Baraina. It has a gram panchayat.  The village is largely agricultural, with maize, jute, and banana.  There is also a new chowk called Shrikrishna Chowk, and a market is growing near the chowk. Every year residents celebrate the Krishna Janmashtami festival.

Villages in Purnia district